Baktash District is in Miandoab County, West Azerbaijan province, Iran. At the 2006 National Census, the region's population (as Zarrineh Rud Rural District) was 15,077 in 3,575 households. The following census in 2011 counted 17,689 people in 4,983 households. At the latest census in 2016, there were 17,756 inhabitants in 5,426 households. After the census, the rural district was elevated to the status of Baktash District, divided into two rural districts, and the former village of Bagtash became a city and capital of the district.

References 

Miandoab County

Districts of West Azerbaijan Province

Populated places in West Azerbaijan Province

Populated places in Miandoab County

fa:بخش بکتاش